Martin Nystrand (born December 28, 1943) is an American composition and education theorist. He is Louise Durham Mead Professor Emeritus in the Department of English at the University of Wisconsin–Madison and Professor Emeritus of Education at the Wisconsin Center for Education Research.

Biography and Career

Early life and education
Martin Nystrand was born in Joliet, Illinois, United States, and grew up in Oak Park, Illinois. He received his B.A. in English from Northwestern University in 1965, his M.A.T. from Johns Hopkins University in 1966, and his Ph.D. in English education from Northwestern University in 1974. During 1971-72, he studied as a special student with James Britton at the University of London.

Career
After teaching as a professor of English at the University of Illinois-Chicago, Nystrand moved to the Department of English at the University of Wisconsin–Madison where he served as architect of a campus-wide reform of undergraduate writing curriculum and founded the doctoral program in Composition & Rhetoric. While also at Wisconsin, he served as a director of the National Research Center on English Learning & Achievement (CELA). Awarded more than $9 million in grants over the course of his career, he was president of the American Education Research Association Special Interest Group for Writing Research, 1991-1993, as well as the National Conference for Research on Language & Literacy (NCRLL), 2002-2003. In addition to editing Written Communication from 1994-2002, Nystrand has published nine books, 60 papers & chapters and was awarded the Distinguished Lifetime Research Award from the NCRLL in 2011.

Research Concepts
Nystrand's research focuses on the dialogic organization of discourse in both writing and classroom discourse. His writing research examines how writing-reader interaction shapes writers' writing processes and development (Nystrand, The Structure of Written Communication: Studies in Reciprocity Between Writers and Readers (Academic Press, 1986). His classroom discourse research probes the role of classroom interaction in student learning and was the first large-scale empirical study to document the role of open classroom discussion in student learning: Nystrand, Opening Dialogue: Understanding the Dynamics of Language and Learning in the English Classroom (Teachers College Press, 1997). His study, "Questions in Time: Investigating the Structure and Dynamics of Unfolding Classroom Discourse" with L. Wu, A. Gamoran, S. Zeiser, D. Long, Discourse Processes, 35 (2003), 135-196) was the first use of event-history analysis to investigate classroom discourse.

Nystrand's work has successfully introduced several seminal concepts in current research:

:

Discourse community
Social groups that share discourse practices. See discourse community Nystrand, M. (1982). Rhetoric's "audience" and linguistics' "speech community": Implications for understanding writing, reading, and text. What writers know: The language, process, and structure of written discourse (pp. 1–30). New York: Academic Press.

Doctrine of autonomous text
Written texts differ from conversational utterances in their explicitness; autonomous texts "say what they mean and mean what they say."  See Nystrand, M., Himley, M., and Doyle, A. (1986). A critical examination of the doctrine of autonomous texts. In M. Nystrand, The Structure of Written Communication: Studies in Reciprocity between Writers and Readers. New York: Academic Press.

Textual space
The semiotic space created by the interaction of writers and readers when texts are read: A text is a manifestation of the textual space whose parameters are defined by reader-writer interaction. See Nystrand, M. (1982). The structure of textual space. In M. Nystrand, What Writers Know: The Language, Orocess, and Structure of Written Discourse (pp. 75–86). New York: Academic Press.

:

Authentic teacher questions
Questions without "prespecified" answers. See Nystrand, M. (1997). Opening Dialogue: Understanding the Dynamics of Language and Learning in the English Classroom. Language and Literacy Series. Teachers College Press, p. 7.

Question events
Interactions surrounding questions plotted in event history analysis. See Nystrand, M., Wu, L.L., Gamoran, A., Zeiser, S., and Long, D.A. (2003). Questions in time: Investigating the structure and dynamics of unfolding classroom discourse. Discourse processes 35 (2), 144.

Dialogic spells and dialogic bids
Dialogic spells are modes of classroom discourse somewhere between recitation and discussion, characterized by engaged student questions and an absence of teacher test questions. A dialogic bid is a teacher discourse move responding to and taking up ideas and observations introduced by students; examples include student questions, uptake, and authentic questions. See Nystrand, M., Wu, L.L., Gamoran, A., Zeiser, S., and Long, D.A. (2003). Questions in time: Investigating the structure and dynamics of unfolding classroom discourse. Discourse processes 35 (2), 144-151.

Research on Writing
Nystrand’s theory of writing posits that written communication is governed by reciprocity between writers and readers, and his model outlines the textual "moves" that writers make vis-à-vis readers in order to initiate and sustain their interaction. Because Nystrand’s theory is based on reciprocity between writer and reader and a dialogic conception of meaning, it differs fundamentally from Grice’s cooperation model of communication, as well as rhetorical conceptions and models of writing which seek to explain writing in terms of effects writers seek to have on readers.

His research on writing examines how writer-reader interaction shapes writers’ writing processes and development. Nystrand’s social-interactive model of writing, in which text meaning is neither (a) found in the writer’s intentions, which, according to cognitive models of writing, the writer "translates" into text, nor (b) embodied in the text itself, as proposed in such formalist accounts of exposition as Olson’s doctrine of autonomous text. Rather, texts are said merely to have a potential for meaning, which is realized only in use, for example, when a text is read (even by the writer). This meaning is dynamic, which is to say, it evolves over the course of reading, a view consistent with Bakhtin, Fish, and Rommetveit; it is not exactly the same from reader to reader or even from reading to reading; and it is entwined with the cultural and ideational assumptions readers bring to the text. This is not to say that readers completely determine the meaning of the text; instead, whatever meaning is achieved is a unique configuration and interaction of what both writer and reader bring to the text. Because meaning is not encoded in the text itself, writers do not achieve explicitness by saying everything in autonomous texts. The writer’s problem in being explicit is not saying everything—a sure-fire recipe for being tedious and boring. Indeed, the writer’s problem is knowing just which points need to be elaborated and which can be assumed. This in turn depends on what readers already know, or more specifically on what the writer and reader share. Explicitness is consequently not a text phenomenon but rather a social-interactive, or dialogic one. Hence, skilled writers anticipate what Bakhtin terms "responsive understanding" at each point of their composing.

The Demographic Postulate: Research on the History of Composition and Rhetoric
Nystrand’s research on the history of writing as an activity and Composition and Rhetoric as an academic area of research has correlated its origins and development amidst increases in social mobility and consequential demographic shifts. Indeed, as Schmandt-Besserat shows, this seems to have been the case as long ago ancient Mesopotamia when in the late fourth millennium BCE, the cuneiform script was invented in the Near East to accommodate a new expanding and expansive commercial class of trading. Later in mid- to late-eighteenth century Britain, as Miller shows, composition and rhetoric first gained traction in provincial colleges, not elite universities like Cambridge and Oxford (where Latin was the principal medium of instruction). During this period, an expanding middle class sought self-improvement through writing instruction, as well as upscaling their working class dialects through enunciation instruction. Dissenters to the Catholic throne and drivers of the Protestant Reformation such as Adam Smith and Joseph Priestley, who were prohibited from teaching at Cambridge and Oxford, took to teaching writing, in English, not Latin. Grammars and dictionaries flourished.

A century later after the American civil war, Charles William Eliot, president of Harvard, led the
expansion and modernization of Harvard, transforming it from a college for sons of the landed
gentry into a modem university dedicated to the education of middle- as well as upperclass
managers in an industrial society–in short, from education serving an agrarian aristocracy to
specialized professional preparation for an industrial meritocracy, or an "aristocracy of
achievement," to quote Charles William Eliot, president of Harvard in 1869. In this way, the new professional classes of the industrial world were to be given "a quite direct preparation of the work habits and thought patterns that are needed to function in any of the 'varied calls of life.'"

Almost exactly a century later in the 1970s, composition studies benefited dramatically from the
radical shifts in the demographics of American colleges. Rarely have the problems of the world
impacted school and university instructional programs as fully as during the late 1960s when
riots torched cities and Vietnam War protests tore at university campuses. The Johnson
administration vigorously sought to increase educational opportunities as a key weapon in its
War on Poverty, and by the late 1960s, a new community college opened every week. And as in eighteenth-century Britain, these non-elite institutions fueled new approaches to composition. In the fall of 1970, six months after four Kent State students were shot dead by National Guard troops, CUNY expedited its policy of open admissions, five years ahead of its planned start in 1975: Brooklyn's enrollments jumped from 14,000-34,000 students. The woeful inadequacy of freshman composition instructors to meet this challenge prompted new research, notably that of Mina Shaughnessy’s Errors and Expectations, published in 1977, who, influenced by Labov's "The logic of non-standard English," published in 1969, sought to show patterns and unconventional patterns in what the critics of the schools saw as so much sloppiness and ignorance. This and much other research, e.g., Flower & Hayes, 1977, formed the basis for new doctoral programs in composition and rhetoric. Between 1980-1995, these programs grew from only a few to currently dozens generating hundreds of PhDs each year. The story of composition studies is very much fueled by demographic shifts involving the dynamics of a marginalized academic concern involving marginalized students on marginalized campuses, and what happened when they each, in their own way, strove for legitimacy.

Research on Classroom Discourse
Nystrand’s research on classroom discourse probes the role of classroom interaction in student learning and was the first large-scale empirical study to document the role of open classroom discussion in student learning. His study with L. Wu, A. Gamoran, S. Zeiser, and D. Long was the first-ever use of event-history analysis to investigate classroom discourse. Dialogic instruction focuses not on what teachers provide or do to students but rather on how teachers and students collaboratively negotiate. High quality classroom discourse is characterized by substantive reciprocity between teachers and their students. In such instruction, students and not just teachers have a lot of input into the business of the classroom and hence what is learned. Nystrand’s companion computer program, CLASS provides a number of measures designed to assess the quality of interaction between teachers and their students. For example, in dialogically organized instruction, teachers engage their students in probing and substantive interactions, and the talk is more like conversation or discussion than recitation. In these classrooms, teachers validate particular student ideas by incorporating their responses into subsequent questions, a process Collins calls "uptake". In the give and take of such talk, student responses and not just teacher questions shape the course of talk. The discourse in these classrooms is therefore less predictable and repeatable because it is "negotiated" and jointly determined—in character, scope, and direction—by both teachers and students as teachers pick up on, elaborate, and question what students say. Such interactions are often characterized by "authentic" questions, which are questions asked to get information, not to see what students know and don't know; i.e., authentic questions are questions without "prespecified" answers. These questions convey the teacher's interest in students' opinions and thoughts. Hence, in contrast to the "test questions" of recitation, they indicate the priority the teacher places on thinking and not just remembering. These "instructional conversations," as Tharp & Gallimore call them, engage students because they validate the importance of students' contributions to learning and instruction. The purpose of such instruction is not so much the transmission of information as the interpretation and collaborative co-construction of understandings. In this kind of classroom talk, teachers take their students seriously

Nystrand is currently working in collaboration with colleagues at the Institute for Intelligent Systems to develop a computer program to autonomously measure and assess classroom discourse as it affects student achievement. Particularly, Nystrand and his colleagues are creating a system that autonomously processes classroom discourse allowing teachers do-it-yourself professional development.

Selected bibliography
Nystrand, M. (2019). Twenty Acres: Events That Transform Us. New York, London, Paris, & Dubai.  KiwaiMedia 
Nystrand, M. (1997). Martin Nystrand with A. Gamoran, R. Kachur, and C. Prendergast, C. Opening Dialogue: Understanding the Dynamics of Language and Learning in the English Classroom. Language and Literacy Series. New York: Teachers College Press.
Nystrand, M. (1986). The Structure of Written Communication: Studies in Reciprocity Between Writers and Readers. New York: Academic Press.
Applebee, A.N., Langer, J.A., Nystrand, M., Gamoran, A. (2003). Discussion-based approaches to developing understanding: Classroom instruction and student performance in middle and high school English. American Educational Research Journal, 40(3), 685-730.
Nystrand, M., and Gamoran, A. (1991). Instructional discourse, student engagement, and literature achievement. Research in the Teaching of English, 1991, 261-290.
Nystrand, M., Wu, L.L., Gamoran, A., Zeiser, S., and Long, D.A. (2003). Questions in Time: Investigating the Structure and Dynamics of Unfolding Classroom Discourse. Discourse Processes 35 (2), 135-198.
Gamoran, A., Nystrand, M., Berends, M., and LePore. P. (1995). An organizational analysis of the effects of ability grouping. American Educational Research Journal 32 (4), 687-715.
Nystrand, M. A social-interactive model of writing. (1989). Written Communication 6 (1), 66-85.
Nystrand, M., Greene, S., and Wiemelt. J. (1993) Where did composition studies come from? An intellectual history. Written Communication 10 (3), 267-333.
Nystrand, M. (1982). What Writers Know: The Language, Process, and Structure of Written Discourse. New York: Academic Press.
Nystrand, M. (2006). Research on the role of classroom discourse as it affects reading comprehension. Research in the Teaching of English, 2006. 392-412.
Nystrand, M., & Gamoran, A. (1991). Student engagement: When recitation becomes conversation. In H. Waxman and H. Walberg (Eds.), Contemporary Research on Teaching. Berkeley: McCutchan.

References

External links
Center for Research on Dialogic Instruction and the In-Class Analysis of Classroom Discourse
CLASS: A Windows Laptop Computer System for the In-Class Analysis of Classroom Discourse
WCER staff page
Google Scholar
Wisconsin Teahouse

1943 births
Living people
University of Wisconsin–Madison faculty
Northwestern University alumni
People from Joliet, Illinois